Manga Mardan is a union council of Khyber Pakhtunkhwa, Pakistan. Which is located on Charsadda Road at a distance of 17 kilometers from Mardan city. The word Manga is an Urdu language word. Who came out of Aman-Ga. These are two separate words which means the home of peace.

The word Manga is an Urdu language word. Who came out of Aman & Gah (in Urdu: امن گاہ). These are two separate words, which means home of peace.

References

Union councils of Mardan District
Populated places in Mardan District